Pierre Pennec (born 19 April 1977) is a French sailor. He competed in the Tornado event at the 2000 Summer Olympics.

References

External links
 

1977 births
Living people
French male sailors (sport)
Olympic sailors of France
Sailors at the 2000 Summer Olympics – Tornado
Place of birth missing (living people)